CNSMP may refer to:

 Centro Nazionale Studi di Musica Popolare
 Conservatoire National Supérieur de Musique de Paris